The Parliament of the Republic of Kazakhstan of the 7th convocation is the 7th and current legislative term of the Parliament of Kazakhstan.

The term convened at its first session on 15 January 2021, after which the following legislative elections where held on 10 January 2021 where 98 members of the Mazhilis were elected based on the party-list proportional representation, while the 9 seats were reserved to the members elected by the Assembly of People on 11 January. Nurlan Nigmatulin, the head of the Nur Otan faction, was unanimously elected as Mazhilis Chair while Balaim Kesebaeva and Pavel Kazantsev were elected as Deputy Chairs.

7th Mazhilis

Structure

Committees

Members

7th Senate 
The legislature of Senate of Kazakhstan the 7th convocation began with the opening of its first session on 15 January 2021 with the senators elected in 2017, 2020 and were appointed by President of Kazakhstan in 2017, 2019, and 2020 continued their terms.

Structure

Senators

References 

Convocations of the Mazhilis
2021 in Kazakhstan
Parliament of Kazakhstan